Robert Bailey Jr. (born October 28, 1989) is an American actor. Beginning his career as a child, Bailey appeared in films Mission to Mars (2000) and Dragonfly (2002), and acted in various television series during the late 1990s and 2000s.

As an adult, Bailey has been a main cast member on medical drama The Night Shift (2014−17) and mystery drama Emergence (2019−20), in addition to a recurring role in science fiction space drama For All Mankind (2022−present).

Biography
Bailey is a native of Minneapolis, Minnesota. He was first discovered at the age of 3 by Family Circle magazine. Bailey's first role was a guest appearance on crime drama Nash Bridges in 1996, at the age of 6. He then appeared in small roles on The Practice, Touched by an Angel, Walker, Texas Ranger and ER. Bailey had a bit part in the first Disney Channel Original Movie, Under Wraps (1997).

He had a recurring role as M.J., a child who is HIV-positive, on Becker (1998−99). For his performance on Becker, Bailey received a Young Artist Award in 1999 for Best Performance in a TV Comedy Series by a Guest Starring Young Actor. In the Hallmark movie Little John (2002), Bailey was the eponymous title character, a young boy who was adopted by his grandfather (Ving Rhames). Bailey appeared in Dragonfly (2002), as a child who communicated with a dead woman after having a near-death experience. He portrayed Barris Hawkins, the son of Wanda Sykes' character, in sitcom Wanda at Large (2003).

Bailey played the role of Reggie in documentary What the Bleep Do We Know? (2005). He provided the voice of Wyborne "Wybie" Lovat in Coraline (2009), a role he reprised in the video game adaptation. Bailey's other film credits include Mission to Mars (2000), Bubble Boy (2001) and The Happening (2008).

He appeared in To Save a Life (2010) as Roger, a disabled friend of the protagonist who kills himself, and Roger's death is the focal point of the story. In 2014, Bailey was cast as intern Dr. Paul Cummings on medical drama The Night Shift. He continued playing the character until the series was cancelled in 2017. He played Chris Minetto, a police officer, in Emergence (2019−20). Bailey portrayed NASA astronaut Will Tyler in For All Mankind (2022).

Filmography

Films

Television

Video games

References

External links 
 
 Bailey on Twitter

1990 births
Living people
African-American male actors
African-American male child actors
American male film actors
American male child actors
American male television actors
Male actors from Minneapolis
21st-century African-American people